Norwegian Fishermans' Church in Liverpool, England, is one of 29 churches organised by Sjømannskirken (Norwegian Church Abroad), a voluntary organisation serving the religious needs of Norwegians abroad on behalf of the Church of Norway.

It is a Grade II listed building, situated in Southwood Road.

See also
Grade II listed buildings in Liverpool-L17
Nordic churches in London
Norwegian Church, Cardiff
Religion in the United Kingdom

References

Norwegian Fishermans' Church
Norwegian Fishermans' Church
Church of Norway
Christian missions to seafarers
Grade II listed churches in Merseyside
Norwegian diaspora in Europe